The Men's Overall in the 2017 FIS Alpine Skiing World Cup involved 36 events in 5 disciplines: downhill (DH) (8 races), Super-G (SG) (6 races), giant slalom (GS) (9 races), slalom (SL) (11 races), and Alpine combined (AC) (2 races). Marcel Hirscher of Austria, 28 years old, won the overall title for the sixth consecutive time, tying one all-time record and breaking another.  Hirscher tied the record for the most overall World Cup titles (six) held since 1979 by Annemarie Moser-Pröll, and broke the record for the most consecutive titles (five) also held by Moser-Pröll.

The season was interrupted by the 2017 World Ski Championships, which were held from 6–20 February in St. Moritz, Switzerland.

The finals were held in Aspen, Colorado (USA) from 15-19 March 2017; however, Hirscher clinched the overall title two weeks earlier, on 4 March, by winning a giant slalom in Kranjska Gora, Slovenia.

Standings

See also
 2017 Alpine Skiing World Cup – Men's summary rankings
 2017 Alpine Skiing World Cup – Men's Downhill
 2017 Alpine Skiing World Cup – Men's Super-G
 2017 Alpine Skiing World Cup – Men's Giant Slalom
 2017 Alpine Skiing World Cup – Men's Slalom
 2017 Alpine Skiing World Cup – Men's Combined
 2017 Alpine Skiing World Cup – Women's Overall

References

External links
 Alpine Skiing at FIS website

Men's Overall
FIS Alpine Ski World Cup overall titles